Heterorhabditis zealandica is a nematode species in the genus Heterorhabditis.

References

External links 

Rhabditida
Nematodes described in 1990